Matteo Pelucchi (born 21 January 1989) is an Italian former professional road cyclist, who last rode for UCI WorldTeam . He also competed in track cycling at a junior level.

Career
In October 2016 he and IAM teammate Aleksejs Saramotins were announced as members of the  squad for 2017.

He retired from competition at the end of the 2021 season.

Major results

2007
 National Junior Track Championships
1st  Kilo
1st  Keirin
2010
 1st Trofeo Papà Cervi
2011
 1st Clásica de Almería
2012
 Ronde de l'Oise
1st  Points classification
1st Stage 3
 1st Stage 5 Four Days of Dunkirk
 3rd Trofeo Migjorn
 8th Grand Prix de Denain
 10th Trofeo Palma de Mallorca
2013
 Circuit de la Sarthe
1st  Points classification
1st Stage 1
 2nd Velothon Berlin
 6th Châteauroux Classic
2014
 1st Stage 2 Vuelta a Burgos
 1st Stage 2 Tirreno–Adriatico
 2nd Grand Prix de Denain
 9th Overall World Ports Classic
 10th Scheldeprijs
2015
 1st Trofeo Santanyi-Ses Salines-Campos
 1st Trofeo Playa de Palma
 Tour de Pologne
1st Stages 2 & 3
 10th Kuurne–Brussels–Kuurne
2017
 2nd Trofeo Playa de Palma
 4th Trofeo Porreres-Felanitx-Ses Salines-Campos
 6th Münsterland Giro
2018
 1st Stage 1 (TTT) Czech Cycling Tour
 1st Stage 3 Okolo Slovenska
 4th Handzame Classic
2019
 Tour de Langkawi
1st Stages 5 & 6
 Tour of Taihu Lake
1st Stages 2 & 4
 1st Stage 3 Vuelta a Aragón
 1st Stage 3 Tour Poitou-Charentes en Nouvelle-Aquitaine
 8th Grote Prijs Marcel Kint

Grand Tour general classification results timeline

References

External links
 

1989 births
Living people
People from Giussano
Italian male cyclists
Cyclists from the Province of Monza e Brianza